Pilibanga (also spelt as Pilibangan) is a town and a municipality in Hanumangarh district in the Indian state of Rajasthan.

Geography

Demographics
 India census, Pilibanga had a population of 33,607. Males constitute 53% of the population and females 47%. Pilibanga has an average literacy rate of 58%, lower than the national average of 59.5%: male literacy is 66%, and female literacy is 48%. In Pilibanga, 15% of the population is under 6 years of age.

Transport 
Auto rickshaws And Cycle rickshaws are majorly used for internal transport. 

Pilibangan is well connected with road and is linked directly to Delhi, Jaipur, Ludhiana, Chandigarh, Sikar, Karnal, Haridwar, Bathinda, Ambala, Jodhpur and many other cities. Nation Highway 15 passes through Pilibangan. Pilibangan has daily train services to Delhi via Bhatinda, Ahmedabad via Jodhpur and Jaipur via Bikaner.

Nearest Airport to Pilibangan is 58Km away in Sri_Ganganagar, Lalgarh Airport served by Supreme_Airlines. Supreme_Airlines has twice a day scheduled services to State capital Jaipur from Sri Ganganagar.
The next nearest airport are Bathinda Airport and Bikaner Airport which has flights to New Delhi and Jaipur.

References

Cities and towns in Hanumangarh district